Hausleiten is a town in the district of Korneuburg in Lower Austria in Austria.

Geography
It lies in the Weinviertel in Lower Austria. About 14.26 percent of the municipality is forested.

References

External links
 Hausleiten Homepage

Cities and towns in Korneuburg District